Lewis Cook is a former award-winning defensive back in the Canadian Football League.

A graduate of University of Idaho, Cook came to Canada to play professional football, having a well traveled career. He began with the Montreal Alouettes, playing 3 games in 1970 (and 21 total regular season games for the Larks) He then moved to the Saskatchewan Roughriders in 1972 for 2 seasons, his best being his first when he intercepted 6 passes and returned one for a touchdown. He then played one season in the short lived World Football League with the Detroit Wheels. He again played for the Montreal Alouettes in 1975, returning a punt 98 yards for a TD and winning the Grey Cup Most Valuable Player award in a losing cause against the Edmonton Eskimos. He played 1976 with the Hamilton Tiger-Cats, rejoined the Saskatchewan Roughriders in 1977, but was traded to the Als yet again, and finished his career with 2 games for the Toronto Argonauts. He had 14 interceptions during his career.

References

1946 births
Players of American football from Tucson, Arizona
Montreal Alouettes players
Saskatchewan Roughriders players
Hamilton Tiger-Cats players
Toronto Argonauts players
Detroit Wheels players
Idaho Vandals football players
Living people